Sušice is a municipality and village in Přerov District in the Olomouc Region of the Czech Republic. It has about 300 inhabitants.

Geography
It lies on the border between the Moravian Gate and Moravian-Silesian Foothills.

History
The first written mention of Sušice is from 1078, when the village was donated to the newly founded Hradisko Monastery. Ownership of the village changed frequently over the years. From 1360, the local fortress and village were held by Jan ze Sušice, but in 1376 Sušice already belonged to Ješek Hromada of Horka and Sušice. In 1392, Sušice was bought by Margrave Jošt, who sold it to the Olomouc Chapter in the same year. However, in 1465, King George of Poděbrady gave Sušice together with other capitular villages to Jiří Ctibor of Cimburk.

From 1609, Sušice belonged to the then owner of the Helfštýn estate, Jiří Bruntálský of Vrbno. He died during the Bohemian Revolt and his properties were confiscated, so in 1622 the village came back into the hands of the Olomouc Chapter. In 1848, serfdom was abolished and Sušice became a sovereign municipality.

References

External links

Villages in Přerov District